Ned McCobb's Daughter is a 1928 American drama film directed by William J. Cowen and starring Irene Rich, Theodore Roberts, and Robert Armstrong. It was also released in a silent version.

Cast
 Irene Rich as Carol  
 Theodore Roberts as Ned McCobb  
 Robert Armstrong as Babe Callahan  
 George Barraud as George Callahan 
 Edward Hearn as Butterworth 
 Carole Lombard as Jennie 
 Louis Natheaux as Kelly
 Carmencita Johnson as Little Girl
 Billy Naylor as Little Boy

References

Bibliography
 Wes D. Gehring. Carole Lombard, the Hoosier Tornado. Indiana Historical Society Press, 2003.

External links

1928 films
American silent feature films
1920s English-language films
American black-and-white films
Pathé Exchange films
1928 drama films
Silent American drama films
Films directed by William J. Cowen
1920s American films